Middle Island, also known as Tong Po Chau is an island of Hong Kong. Administratively, it is part of Southern District.

Geography
Middle Island is located 100 m off the southern coast of Hong Kong Island, between Deep Water Bay and Repulse Bay.

Features
Middle Island houses one of the three clubhouses of the Royal Hong Kong Yacht Club. The clubhouse is accessible by the Club's own sampan ferry from Deep Water Bay. Close to the clubhouse is a beach that is accessible to the public.

The island also houses the Middle Island Clubhouse of the Aberdeen Boat Club. The Clubhouse is open daily except Mondays.

There is also a Tin Hau temple and a Tai Wong Ye temple on the island.

See also

 List of islands and peninsulas of Hong Kong

References

External links

 Transportation to Middle Island
 Map centered on the island

Southern District, Hong Kong
Islands of Hong Kong
Populated places in Hong Kong